Thunder Over The Plains is a 1953 American Western film directed by Andre DeToth and starring Randolph Scott with Lex Barker, Phyllis Kirk, Henry Hull, Elisha Cook, Jr. and Fess Parker. It was Barker's first film after starring in five Tarzan pictures.

Plot
Set in 1869, during the Reconstruction Era following the Civil War, Texas had not yet been readmitted to the Union and carpetbaggers, hiding behind the legal protection of the Union Army of occupation, are levying high taxes through occupying local government positions and using the locals' financial distress to acquire assets at well below normal value. Federal Captain Porter (Randolph Scott), a Texan, has to enforce the letter of the law against the violent opposition of his own people. Porter also needs to contend with a strident fellow officer, Captain Bill Hodges. Porter arrests the rebel leader Ben Westman (Charles McGraw) on what he knows is a false murder charge. In trying to prove Westman's innocence, Porter himself becomes a wanted man.

Cast
 Randolph Scott as Capt. David Porter  
 Lex Barker as Capt. Bill Hodges
 Phyllis Kirk as Norah Porter
 Charles McGraw as Ben Westman
 Henry Hull as Lt. Col. Chandler
 Elisha Cook, Jr. as Joseph Standish
 Hugh Sanders as H. L. Balfour
 Lane Chandler as Mike Faraday
 James Brown as Conrad
 Fess Parker as Kirby

References

External links
 
 
 
 

1953 films
1953 Western (genre) films
American Western (genre) films
Films set in Texas
Films set in 1869

Films directed by Andre DeToth
Films scored by David Buttolph
Warner Bros. films
1950s English-language films
1950s American films